Konyovo is a rural locality (a selo) and the administrative center of Konyovskoye Rural Settlement of Plesetsky District, Arkhangelsk Oblast, Russia. The population was 2,838 as of 2010. There are 23 streets.

Geography 
Konyovo is located on the Onega River, 92 km southwest of Plesetsk (the district's administrative centre) by road. Avdotyino is the nearest rural locality.

References 

Rural localities in Plesetsky District